Nea Sinopi is a village and a community of Preveza regional unit, in the region of Epirus, in western Greece. The community consists of the villages Nea Sinopi and Archangelos. It is situated between low hills, at about 40 m elevation. It is about 15 kilometers north of the town of Preveza. Its population in 2011 was 533 for the village, and 864 for the community.

Population

History

Archangelos and Neo Sinopi were founded in 1922, as a result of the population exchange between Greece and Turkey. Many of the refugees were from a village near modern Sinop.

The Roman aqueduct

In Archangelos, there are some remains of the Roman aqueduct of ancient Nicopolis. The Roman aqueduct, 50 km long, carried the water from the springs of Louros to two cisterns in the Nymphaeum of Nikopolis. It was constructed after the foundation of Nikopolis by Octavianus Augustus.

External links
The website of Archangelos, Preveza

References

Populated places in Preveza (regional unit)